The German military submarines known as U-boats that were in action during World War II were built between 1935 and 1944, and were numbered in sequence from U-1 upwards. Numbering was according to the sequence in which construction orders were allocated to the individual shipyards, rather than commissioning date; thus some boats carrying high numbers were commissioned well before boats with lower numbers. Later in the war, whole contracts for older designs were sometimes cancelled in favour of newer designs, with the numbers allocated being reused later.

The U-boat fleet sank large tonnages of Allied shipping, both warships and merchant ships. Most of the U-boats were ultimately lost in combat or were scuttled.

References

World War II raiding careers
.U-boat raiding careers
U-boat raiding careers
U-boat raiding careers
U-boat raiding careers